is a railway station in the city of Nagaoka, Niigata Prefecture, Japan, operated by East Japan Railway Company (JR East).

Lines

Station layout
The station consists of two ground-level opposed side platforms serving two tracks. The platforms are connected by a footbridge.

The station is unattended. Suica farecard cannot be used at this station.

Platforms

History 
It was renamed to its present name on 1 October 1915. With the privatization of Japanese National Railways (JNR) on 1 April 1987, the station came under the control of JR East.

Surrounding area
Washima Post Office
former Kashima village hall

See also
 List of railway stations in Japan

References

External links

 Bunsui Station information 

Railway stations in Nagaoka, Niigata
Stations of East Japan Railway Company
Railway stations in Japan opened in 1913
Echigo Line